William Hennessy (born 13 May 1968) is an Irish former hurler. At club level he played with Tullaroan and was also a member of the Kilkenny senior hurling team. After beginning his career at wing-back he later lined out at midfield.

Career

Hennessy first came to prominence at juvenile and underage levels with the Tullaroan club before eventually joining the club's top adult team. He enjoyed his first success in 1988 when Tullaroan won the County Intermediate Championship before claiming the County Senior Championship title in 1994. Hennessy first appeared on the inter-county scene with the Kilkenny under-21 team that suffered All-Ireland final defeat by Cork in 1988. This success saw him drafted on to the Kilkenny senior hurling team in 1989. Hennessy would go on to line out in three consecutive All-Ireland finals at senior level and, after defeat by Tipperary in 1991, claimed consecutive winners' medals against Cork in 1992 and Galway in 1993. His other honours include two National League titles and three consecutive Leinster Championship medals. After leaving the panel with the intention of emigrating, Hennessy was recalled for one final season in 1996.

Honours

Team

Tullaroan
Kilkenny Senior Hurling Championship: 1994
Kilkenny Intermediate  Hurling Championship: 1988

Kilkenny
All-Ireland Senior Hurling Championship: 1992, 1993
Leinster Senior Hurling Championship: 1991, 1992, 1993
National Hurling League: 1989-90, 1994-95
Leinster Under-21 Hurling Championship: 1988

Individual

Awards
Tullaroan Hurling Team of the Century: Right corner-back

References 

1968 births
Living people
Tullaroan hurlers
Kilkenny inter-county hurlers
All-Ireland Senior Hurling Championship winners